The election to choose county executives in Maryland occurred on Tuesday, November 7, 2006. The U.S. House election, 2006, U.S. Senate election, 2006, 2006 Maryland gubernatorial election, 2006 Maryland Senate election and 2006 Maryland House of Delegates election took place on the same day. Seven charter counties elected a county executive: Anne Arundel County, Baltimore County, Harford County, Howard County, Montgomery County, Prince George's County, and Wicomico County.  This race coincided with the election for Maryland County Offices Election, 2006.

Anne Arundel County
The general election in Anne Arundel County was between Democratic George F. Johnson IV, a retired police officer from Pasadena, and Republican John R. Leopold, a member of the Maryland House of Delegates.

Baltimore County 
The general election in Baltimore County was between incumbent Democrat James T. Smith Jr. and Republican challenger Clarence Bell, a former police officer.

Harford County 
The general election in Harford County was between incumbent Republican David R. Craig and Democratic challenger Ann C. Helton, a local non-profit executive.

Howard County 
The Howard County general election was a three-way race between Democratic candidate Ken Ulman, Republican candidate Christopher J. Merdon, and Independent candidate C. Stephen Wallis. Ulman and Merdon were both members of the Howard County Council, while Wallis was a middle school principal.

Montgomery County
The general election in Montgomery County was a three-way race. Democratic candidate Isiah Leggett was a former Montgomery County councilman and law professor at Howard University. Republican candidate Chuck Floyd was a previous candidate for the United States House of Representatives. Independent candidate Robin Ficker was a former member of the Maryland House of Delegates.

Prince George's County
In Prince George's county, Democratic incumbent Jack B. Johnson ran unopposed in the general election.

Wicomico County

In 2004, Wicomico County voters approved a charter amendment establishing an elected county executive, beginning in 2006. There were three established candidates in this inaugural election. The Democratic candidate was Richard M. Politt Jr, Fruitland, Maryland's City Manager. The nominated Republican candidate was Ronald G. Alessi Sr, a small business owner. Another Republican, Charles J. Jannace III, launched a write-in campaign.

See also

References

County executives
County government in Maryland
Maryland county executives